Cyana conclusa is a moth of the subfamily Arctiinae. It was described by Francis Walker in 1862. It is found on Borneo and Sumatra. The habitat consists of lowland forest types, excluding heath forests.

References

Cyana
Moths described in 1862